Moroak Station is a pastoral lease that operates as a cattle station in Northern Territory, Australia.

The Roper River flows through the property and acts as the southern boundary of Moroak and the northern boundary of Elsey Station. Moroak is bounded to the north by Mountain Valley Station, to the west by Goondooloo and to the east by Flying Fox Station.

The traditional owners of the area are the Mangarrayi people. Some of the Mangarrayi work as rangers along the river.

Alfred Thick owned the property in 1949.
 
The property is run by Tony Davis, who acquired it in 2004 for 10 million, and who also owned Limbunya Station. Between 2004 and 2014 Davis built 40 additional dams, had the property completely fenced and made improvements to the homestead.

See also
List of ranches and stations

References

Pastoral leases in the Northern Territory
Stations (Australian agriculture)